Auto-collateralisation is a credit operation that is or can be triggered, when a buyer does not have sufficient funds to settle a securities transaction, in order to improve its cash position for the next settlement cycle. The credit provided can be secured using securities already held by the buyer (“collateral stocks”) or the securities that are being purchased (“collateral flows”).

See also  
 T2S

External links 
 TARGET2-Securities page on the ECB website
 ECB proposal for the T2S Project

Credit